Janice Nadeau is a Canadian illustrator, art director and animation director.

Biography
Janice Nadeau studied graphic design at Université du Québec à Montréal and illustration at École supérieure des arts décoratifs in Strasbourg. In 2005, she created the illustrations for Corteo, Cirque du Soleil's international touring show. She has illustrated a number of books, and is a three-time recipient of the Governor General's Award for Illustration, Canada's most prestigious literary prize, for No fish where to go (Les 400 coups, 2003), Ma meilleure amie (Québec Amérique, 2007) and Harvey (la Pastèque, 2009). In 2014, she co-directed the adaptation of No fish where to go as an animated short film at the National Film Board of Canada (NFB). The film won the International Film Critics Awards (the FIPRESCI Prize) at the Annecy International Animated Film Festival, where it had its world premiere in June 2014.

Janice Nadeau's latest film is her animated short, Mamie, written and directed for the French production company Folimage in co-production with the National Film Board of Canada (NFB). She also teaches illustration at the School of Design at Université du Québec à Montréal.

Awards 

Nadeau received several awards:

 2014: International Film Critics Awards (the FIPRESCI Prize) at the Annecy Festival for No fish where to go.
 2013: Animation director in residence at the Abbey of Fontevraud (France).
 2013: Folimage Prize at the Annecy International Animated Film Festival for Mamie.
 2012: Sprint for you Script! – SODEC/SARTEC Prize for Mamie.
 2005, 2007, 2011: The White Ravens, Germany.
 2004, 2007, 2010: Applied Arts Awards Annual.
 2004, 2008, 2009: Governor General's Award.
 2004, 2008, 2009: LUX Award for "Best Illustration".
 2004: Marcel Couture Award, Montreal's Book Fair.

References

External links 
 

1977 births
Living people
French Quebecers
Artists from Quebec
Film directors from Quebec
Canadian animated film directors
Canadian art directors
Canadian illustrators
Canadian women illustrators
Canadian women film directors
People from Gatineau
Université du Québec à Montréal alumni
Academic staff of the Université du Québec à Montréal
Canadian women animators
Women graphic designers